Édson dos Santos (born 19 March 1933), sometimes known as just Édson, is a Brazilian footballer. He played in 18 matches for the Brazil national football team from 1956 to 1959. He was also part of Brazil's squad for the 1959 South American Championship that took place in Ecuador.

References

External links
 

1933 births
Living people
Brazilian footballers
Brazil international footballers
Association football defenders
People from Ilhéus
Sportspeople from Bahia